Rodney Keith McFarlane (born 16 December 1950) is a former Australian rules footballer who played with Essendon in the Victorian Football League (VFL). He won the league reserves goalkicking in 1972. McFarlane left Essendon in 1973 to play with Prahran in the Victorian Football Association (VFA). He played four seasons with Prahran and later returned to his original team, Coburg Amateurs, coaching them from 1980 to 1982.

Notes

External links 		

	
Essendon Football Club past player profile

Living people
1950 births
Australian rules footballers from Victoria (Australia)		
Essendon Football Club players
Prahran Football Club players